Michielsen is a surname. Notable people with the surname include:

Aloïs Michielsen (born 1942), Belgian businessman
Marion Michielsen (born 1985), Dutch contract bridge player